Pogonocherus ressli is a species of beetle in the family Cerambycidae. It was described by Holzschuh in 1977. It is known from Iran and Azerbaijan.

References

Pogonocherini
Beetles described in 1977